Mix FM is a Cypriot radio station in Strovolos, Nicosia, Cyprus. It started broadcasting on 23 February 2002 via 102.3 FM in Nicosia, Paphos, Larnaca, Famagusta and 90.8 FM in Limassol.

External links
Mix FM Cyprus

Radio stations in Cyprus
Radio stations established in 2002
Adult contemporary radio stations
2002 establishments in Cyprus